Rubus violaceifrons is a tetraploid species of nemophilous bramble in the subgenus Rubus, possibly endemic to Bohemia, where it grows in forest margins and clearings. It has white flowers with bright red-purple styles and densely-haired leaves. Canes are purple-spotted in the shade and brown-red in sunny areas.

References

violaceifrons
Plants described in 2022